TiVo Corporation, formerly known as the Rovi Corporation and Macrovision Solutions Corporation, was an American technology company. Headquartered in San Jose, California, the company is primarily involved in licensing its intellectual property within the consumer electronics industry, including digital rights management, electronic program guide software, and metadata. The company holds over 6,000 pending and registered patents. The company also provides analytics and recommendation platforms for the video industry.

In 2016, Rovi acquired digital video recorder maker TiVo Inc., and renamed itself TiVo Corporation. On May 30, 2019, TiVo announced the appointment of Dave Shull as the company's new president and CEO.

On December 19, 2019, TiVo merged with Xperi; the combined firm operates as Xperi.

History
Macrovision Corporation was established in 1983. The 1984 film The Cotton Club was the first video to be encoded with Macrovision technology when it was released in 1985. The technology was subsequently extended to DVD players and other consumer electronic recording and playback devices such as digital cable and satellite set-top boxes, digital video recorders, and portable media players. By the end of the 1980s, most major Hollywood studios were utilizing their services.

In the 1990s, Macrovision acquired companies with expertise in managing access control and secure distribution of other forms of digital media, including music, video games, internet content, and computer software.

John O. Ryan (founder and CEO of Macrovision from June 1995 to October 2001) and William A. Krepick (president of Macrovision Corporation from July 1995 to July 2005 and CEO from October 2001 to July 2005) led the company through an IPO in 1997 priced at $9.00 a share. Under their leadership, the company went from a private company with sales of under $20 million to a global, publicly traded corporation with annual sales of $220 million and market cap exceeding $1 billion.

In July 2005, the company hired Alfred J. Amoroso as chief executive officer and president to succeed William A. Krepick, who announced his retirement earlier in the year.

Macrovision acquired Gemstar-TV Guide on May 2, 2008, in a cash-and-stock deal worth about $2.8 billion. The combined company would seek to be “the homepage for the TV experience,” said Mr. Amoroso.

After the announcement of its intent to buy Gemstar-TV Guide, Macrovision made other changes in order to focus on entertainment technology, including selling its software business unit, valued at approximately $200 million, to private equity firm Thoma Cressey Bravo. The divestiture of the software business unit closed on April 1, 2008, becoming Acresso Software. Macrovision also ultimately sold off parts of Gemstar-TV Guide not focused on digital entertainment, including TryMedia, eMeta, TV Guide Magazine, TV Guide Network and the TV Games Network.

The company also bought two companies providing entertainment metadata: All Media Guide on November 6, 2007, and substantially all the assets of Muze, Inc. on April 15, 2009.

As Rovi

On July 16, 2009, Macrovision Solutions Corporation announced the official change of its name to Rovi Corporation.

Rovi announced its first product on January 7, 2010 – TotalGuide, an interactive media guide that incorporated entertainment data, to search, browse and provide recommendations. On March 16, 2010, Rovi acquired MediaUnbound for an undisclosed amount. MediaUnbound had helped build static and dynamic personalization and recommendation engines for clients such as Napster, eMusic and MTV Networks. On June 16, 2010, the company announced the Rovi Advertising Network which bundled guide advertising and third-party interactive TV platforms.

On December 23, 2010, the company announced its intention to acquire Sonic Solutions and its DivX video software in a deal valued at $720 million. Sonic provided digital video processing, playback and distribution technologies and owned RoxioNow (formerly CinemaNow) an OTT technology provider.

On March 1, 2011, Rovi announced its acquisition of online video guide SideReel.

The company announced Amoroso's intention to retire on May 26, 2011. Tom Carson, formerly the executive vice president of sales and marketing, was appointed CEO and President in December 2011. Under Carson the company shifted its focus on "growth opportunities related to its core enabling technology and services" and it announced that it intended to sell the Rovi Entertainment Store business. It entered into separate agreements to sell the Rovi Entertainment Store to Reliance Majestic Holdings, a private equity-backed company; and its consumer websites to All Media Networks, a new company, in July 2013. Continuing on this path, the company made a similar announcement in January 2014 indicating its intent to sell the DivX and MainConcept businesses.

On April 1, 2013, Rovi acquired Integral Reach, a provider of predictive analysis services. The technology would be integrated into Rovi's audience analysis services.

In April 2013, Facebook began licensing Rovi metadata for use within the service.

As TiVo Corporation 

On April 29, 2016, Rovi Corporation announced that it had acquired TiVo Inc. for $1.1 billion. The combined company operated under the TiVo brand, and held over 6,000 pending and registered patents. Rovi plans to discontinue in-house hardware production, and focus primarily on licensing its technologies and the TiVo brand to third-party companies.

In December 2019, TiVo Corporation announced their intent to merge with Xperi. The surviving entity will operate under the Xperi name and have a combined value of $3 billion. TiVo had previously considered splitting out its hardware operations from its licensing operations. The merger was completed on June 1, 2020.

Products

Guides
Rovi provides guides for service providers and CE manufacturers.
 TotalGuide xD, a white-label media guide for mobile devices for finding, managing, and watching TV shows and movies. This also controlled the set top boxes.
 TotalGuide CE, a media guide for CE manufacturers that gives access to broadcast programming, premium over-the-top (OTT) entertainment, and catch-up TV
 Passport Guide and i-Guide, interactive program guides for service providers
 G-Guide, an HTML5-based program guide for digital terrestrial, broadcast satellite, and commercial satellite services
 TotalTV, an online guide enabling websites for news and entertainment organizations to incorporate local TV listings
 Rovi DTA Guide, an interactive program guide designed for households installed with Digital terminal adapters

Data
Rovi provides entertainment metadata for consumer electronics manufacturers, service providers, retailers, online portals and application developers around the world. The company has over 50 years of metadata for video, music, books, and games covering more than 5 million movies and TV programs, 3.2 million album releases and 30 million song tracks, 9 million in-print and out-of-print book titles, and 70,000 video games. The metadata includes basic facts, local TV listings and channel line-ups for interactive program guides, original editorial, imagery, and other features.

Search and Recommendations
Rovi Search Service allows consumer electronics manufacturers, service providers, and developers to provide solutions that enable consumers to search for and access desired content. Rovi Recommendations Service is a cloud-based service that offers consumers entertainment choices similar to their chosen program, movie, album, track, musician or band.

Advertising
Rovi Advertising Service enables the monetization of entertainment platforms. It places ads that appear as content choices in application menus and user interfaces for set-top boxes, connected TVs, smartphones, tablets, Blu-ray players, game consoles and other devices.

Rovi Audience Management
Rovi Audience Management is a suite of products (Advertising Optimizer and Promotion Optimizer) combining big data with predictive analytics to provide TV audience insights and advertising campaign management. Ad Optimizer allows provides campaign management and media planning capabilities to TV networks and multichannel video programming distributors (MVPDs). Promo Optimizer uses past viewing data to enable cable and broadcast networks to create plans for on-air promos.

Legacy products
The company historically developed technologies and products that helped protect content from being pirated. Its two core legacy products were called RipGuard and ACP (analog copy protection).

RipGuard

Macrovision introduced its RipGuard technology in February 2005. It was designed to prevent or reduce digital DVD copying by altering the format of the DVD content to disrupt the ripping software. Although the technology could be circumvented by several current DVD rippers such as AnyDVD or DVDFab, Macrovision claimed that 95% of casual users lack the knowledge and/or determination to be able to copy a DVD with RipGuard technology.

Analog Copy Protection (ACP)

Analog video formats convey video signals as a series of "lines". Most of these lines are used for constructing the visible image, and are shown on the screen. But several more lines exist which do not convey visual information. Known as the vertical blanking interval (VBI), these extra lines historically served no purpose other than to contain the vertical synchronizing pulses, but in more modern implementations they are used to carry or convey different things in different countries; for example closed captioning.

Macrovision's legacy analog copy protection (ACP) works by implanting a series of excessive voltage pulses within the off-screen VBI lines of video. These pulses were included physically within pre-existing recordings on VHS and Betamax and were generated upon playback by a chip in DVD players and digital cable or satellite boxes. A DVD recorder receiving an analog signal featuring these pulses would detect them and display a message saying that the source is "copy-protected" followed by aborting the recording. VCRs, in turn, react to these excessive voltage pulses by compensating with their automatic gain control circuitry. This causes the recorded picture to wildly change brightness, rendering it annoying to watch. The system was only effective on VCRs made in the mid-1980s. In addition, these voltage pulses caused some TVs to lose track of the vertical blanking interval, meaning they no longer knew when one frame ended and the next began. This caused the picture to roll wildly up and down the screen on affected sets.

A later form of Macrovision's analog copy protection, called Level II ACP, introduced multiple 180-degree phase inversions to the analog signal's color burst. Also known as color striping, this technology caused numerous off-color bands to appear within the picture.

Another form of analog copy protection, known as CGMS-A, is added by DVD players and digital cable/satellite boxes. While not invented by Macrovision, the company's products implemented it. CGMS-A consists of a "flag" within the vertical blanking interval (essentially data, like closed captioning) which digital recording devices search for. If present, it refused to record the signal, just as with the earlier ACP technology. Unlike digital recording equipment, however, analog VCRs do not respond to CGMS-A encoded video and would record it successfully if ACP is not also present.

Historically, the original Macrovision technology was considered a nuisance to some specialist users because it could interfere with other electronic equipment. For example, if one were to run a video signal through a VCR before the television, some VCRs will output a ruined signal regardless of whether it is recording. This also occurs in some TV-VCR combo sets. Apart from this, many DVD recorders mistake the mechanical instability of worn videotapes for Macrovision signals, and so refuse to make what would be perfectly legal DVD dubs of legitimate video tapes, such as home movies. This widespread problem was another factor contributing to the demand for devices that defeat Macrovision. The signal has also been known to confuse home theater line doublers (devices for improving the quality of video for large projection TVs) and some high-end television comb filters. In addition, Macrovision confuses many upconverters (devices that convert a video signal to a higher resolution), causing them to shut down and refuse to play Macrovision content.

There are also devices called stabilizers, video stabilizers or enhancers available that filter out the Macrovision spikes and thereby defeat the system. The principle of their function lies in detecting the vertical synchronization signal, and forcing the lines occurring during the VBI to black level, removing the AGC-confusing pulses. They can be easily built by hobbyists, as nothing more than a cheap microcontroller together with an analog multiplexer and a little other circuitry is needed. Individuals less experienced with such things can purchase video stabilizers.

Discs made with DVD copying programs such as DVD Shrink automatically disable any Macrovision copy protection. The ease with which Macrovision and other copy protection measures can be defeated has prompted a steadily growing number of DVD releases that do not have copy protection of any kind, Content Scramble System (CSS) or Macrovision.

United States fair use law, as interpreted in the decision over Betamax (Sony Corp. v. Universal City Studios), dictates that consumers are fully within their legal rights to copy videos they own. However, the legality has changed somewhat with the controversial Digital Millennium Copyright Act. After April 26, 2002, no VCR may be manufactured or imported without Automatic Gain Control circuitry (which renders VCRs vulnerable to Macrovision). This is contained in title 17, section 1201(k) of the Digital Millennium Copyright Act. However, there are a number of mostly older VCR models on the market that are not affected by Macrovision.

On October 26, 2001, the sale, purchase, or manufacture of any device that has no commercial purpose other than disabling Macrovision copy protection was made illegal under section 1201(a) of the same controversial act.

In June 2005, Macrovision sent a cease and desist letter to "Lightning UK!", the maker of DVD Decrypter, a program that allows users to back up their DVDs by bypassing CSS and Macrovision. They later acquired the rights to this software.

In June 2005, Macrovision sued Sima Products under section 1201 of the DMCA, claiming that Sima's video processors provided a way to circumvent Macrovision's analog copy protection. Sima received an injunction barring the sale of this device, but the parties ultimately settled without a judgment on the legal issues.

As Macrovision
 In 2000, Macrovision acquired Globetrotter, creators of the FLEXlm, which was subsequently renamed Flexnet.
 In 2002, Macrovision acquired Israeli company Midbar Technologies, developers of the Cactus Data Shield music copy protection solution for $17 million. Additionally the same year, Macrovision acquired all the music copy protection and digital rights management (DRM) assets of TTR Technologies (formerly NASDAQ listed under the ticker TTRE).
 In 2004, Macrovision acquired InstallShield, creators of installation authoring software (later divested to private equity).
 In 2005, Macrovision acquired the intellectual property rights to DVD Decrypter from its developer.
 In 2005, Macrovision acquired ZeroG Software, creators of InstallAnywhere (direct competition to InstallShield MP (MultiPlatform)), and Trymedia Systems.
 In 2006, Macrovision acquired eMeta.
 On January 1, 2007, Macrovision acquired Mediabolic, Inc.
 On November 6, 2007, Macrovision announced its intention to acquire All Media Guide.
 On December 7, 2007, Macrovision announced an agreement to acquire Gemstar-TV Guide and completed the purchase on August 5, 2008.
 On December 19, 2007, Macrovision purchased BD+ DRM technology from Cryptography Research, Inc.
 On April 15, 2009, Macrovision announced that it has acquired substantially all of the assets of Muze, Inc.

As Rovi
 On March 16, 2010, Rovi acquired Recommendations Service MediaUnbound.
 On December 23, 2010, Rovi announced its intention to acquire Sonic Solutions.
 On March 1, 2011, Rovi acquired SideReel.
 On May 5, 2011, Rovi acquired DigiForge.
 In 2012, Rovi acquired Snapstick.
 In February 2012, Rovi sold Roxio to Corel.
 On April 1, 2013, Rovi acquired Integral Reach.
 On February 25, 2014, Rovi acquired Veveo.
 On November 3, 2014, Rovi acquired Fanhattan, a company that ran the Fan TV service, and owners of The Movie Database, for $12.0 million in cash.
 On April 29, 2016, Rovi confirmed that it would acquire TiVo for approximately $1.1 billion.

See also
 TiVo digital video recorders
 DCS Copy Protection
 Automatic content recognition
 Tivoization

References

Additional sources
Fil's FAQ-Link-In Corner: MacroVision FAQ 
MPAA | DVD Frequently Asked Questions 
Columbia ISA: Macrovision Details 
Macrovision Agrees to Sell Software Unit  (expired link)
Realnetworks Acquires Game Distributor From Macrovision 
 Adobe LM Service – Adobelmsvc.exe – Program Information (archive)
Rovi Acquires DigiForge 
Rovi Corporation Appoints Thomas Carson as President and Chief Executive Officer

External links

Howstuffworks: "How does copy protection on a video tape work?"
Ars Technica: "Digitizing video signals might violate the DMCA"

Manufacturing companies based in San Jose, California
Companies formerly listed on the Nasdaq
Technology companies established in 1983
American companies established in 1983
Technology companies disestablished in 2020
American companies disestablished in 2020
Digital technology
TiVo
Xperi
1997 initial public offerings
2020 mergers and acquisitions